The Trans-Mediterranean Pipeline (TransMed; also Enrico Mattei gas pipeline) is a natural gas pipeline from Algeria via Tunisia to Sicily and thence to mainland Italy. An extension of the TransMed pipeline delivers Algerian gas to Slovenia.

History
The pipeline from Algeria to Italy was proposed in 1960s. A preliminary feasibility study was conducted in 1969 and the first route survey in 1970. In 1974–75, technical tests of laying pipes in the Mediterranean Sea were carried out. In 1977, supply and transit agreements were signed.

The first phase of pipeline was constructed in 1978–1983 and second phase in 1991–1994.  The capacity of the pipeline was doubled in 1994. In 2000, the gas pipeline was named after Enrico Mattei.

In the fall of 1997, a terrorist attack severed the pipeline in Algeria for five days.  The pipeline was listed under the Critical Foreign Dependencies Initiative by the United States in a diplomatic cable leaked to WikiLeaks.

Route
The pipeline begins from the Hassi R'mel field in Algeria and runs  to the Tunisian border. It landfalls in Mazara del Vallo in Sicily.

Technical description
The Algerian section consists of a compressor station and two lines with  diameter. The Tunisian section consists of three compressor stations and two lines of  diameter. In 2007, SCOGAT (Société pour la Construction du Gazoduc Transtunisien) awarded the Italian contractor Saipem a contract for two new gas compression stations and the upgrading of the existing compressor stations allowing to increase the capacity of Tunisian section by 6.5 bcm. The royalties for the gas transport received by Tunisia are 5.25 — 6.75 percent value of the transported gas.

In 2012 the capacity of the pipeline increased from 30.2 billion cubic meter (bcm) of natural gas per year up to 33.5 bcm by 2012.

Operators
Algerian section is operated by Algerian state-owned company Sonatrach. The Tunisian section is owned by the state-owned Sotugat (Société Tunisienne du Gazoduc Trans-tunisien) and operated by TTPC (Eni group, 100%). The section across the Channel of Sicily is operated by TMPC, a joint venture of Eni and Sonatrach.  The Italian section is operated by Snam Rete Gas.

See also

 Medgaz
 GALSI
 Greenstream pipeline
 Maghreb–Europe Gas Pipeline
 Trans-Saharan gas pipeline

References

Energy infrastructure completed in 1983
Natural gas pipelines in Italy
Natural gas pipelines in Algeria
Natural gas pipelines in Tunisia
Italy–Tunisia relations
Eni
Algeria–Italy relations
Algeria–Tunisia relations
Pipelines under the Mediterranean Sea
1983 establishments in Algeria
1983 establishments in Tunisia
1983 establishments in Italy